Nevado Sajama is an extinct stratovolcano and the highest peak in Bolivia. The mountain is located in Sajama Province, in Oruro Department. It is situated in Sajama National Park and is a composite volcano consisting of a stratovolcano on top of several lava domes. It is not clear when it erupted last but it may have been during the Pleistocene or Holocene.

The mountain is covered by an ice cap, and Polylepis tarapacana trees occur up to  elevation.

Geography and geomorphology
Cholcani volcano lies southeast of Sajama, and another neighbouring volcano, Pomerape, resembles Sajama in its appearance. A road runs along the southeastern flank of the volcano, with additional roads completing a circle around Sajama. The village of Sajma lies on its western foot, with the village of Caripe to the northeast of the mountain and Lagunas to the southwest, and there are a number of farms.

Nevado Sajama lies in the Western Andes of Bolivia and in the western side of the Altiplano; more specifically the mountain is located before the Western Cordillera.

Below  the mountain is characterized by parasitic vents and a cover of lava fragments and volcanic ash. Two secondary summits  and  occur west and east-northeast from Sajama respectively; the former is named Cerro Huisalla and the second is Huayna Potosi. The mountain has a conical shape and is capped by a summit crater that, owing to its ice fill, appears to be linked to the flat summit plateau of Sajama but other records do not indicate the presence of a crater. The Patokho, Huaqui Jihuata and Phajokhoni valleys are located on the eastern flank; at lower elevations the whole volcano features glacially deepened valleys.

The terrain is characterized by a continuous ice cover in the central sector of the mountain, exposures of bedrock, deposits and rock glaciers in some sites, alluvial fans and scree in the periphery of Sajama and moraines forming a girdle around the upper sector of Sajama. The ground moraines are the most prominent moraines on Sajama, and have varying colours depending on the source of their component rocks. Vegetation and small lakes occur in their proximity, while other parts are unvegetated. They mostly occur within glacial valleys, but some appear to have formed underneath small plateau ice caps on flatter terrain.

A number of wetlands called bofedales occur on the mountain. Starting in the lake Laguna Huana Kkota on the northwestern foot of Sajama, the Tomarapi River flows first northeastward, then east, south and southeast around the northern and eastern flanks of the volcano; the Sicuyani River, which originates on Sajama, joins it there. The southern flanks give rise to the Huaythana River, which flows directly south and then makes a sharp turn to the east. The Sajama River originates on the western side of the volcano, flowing due south and increasingly turning southeast before joining the Lauca River. The other rivers draining Sajama and its ice cap also eventually join the Lauca River and end in the Salar de Coipasa.

Geology

Nevado Sajama is part of the Central Volcanic Zone of the Andes, where volcanism is triggered by the subduction of the Nazca Plate beneath the South America Plate. Changes in the subduction regime took place during the Oligocene and directed an increase of volcanic activity in the region. Volcanoes in the region have ages ranging from Pleistocene to Miocene and grew on top of earlier ignimbrites; the whole volcanic activity was controlled by faults.

The mountain is a stratovolcano located atop several lava domes. The stratovolcano consists of lava flows and pyroclastic material that radiate away from the centre of the volcano. Some parasitic vents occur southeast of Sajama and have produced lava domes and lava flows. The parasitic vents away from the volcano are older and their location appears to be controlled by radial dikes; the whole complex is a compound volcano. Two later volcanic units are known as the Colquen Wilqui lavas and the Jacha Khala tuff. The Sajama volcano rises within a caldera that has been buried by later volcanic activity so that it is only recognizable on its eastern-northeastern side. A circular structure around Sajama may be the origin of the 2.7 million years old Lauca-Perez Ignimbrite.

Argon-argon dating has yielded ages of 679,000 years ago from Sajama and of 80,900 to 25,000 years ago for the Kkota Kkotani lavas, which are unrelated to the main Sajama volcano. The date of the last eruption is not known, it may have occurred in the Pleistocene or Holocene.

Three major geologic lineaments occur in the region, the north-northwesterly trending Sajama lineament, a west-southwesterly one aligned with high topographical features and a west-northwesterly one. The west-southwesterly one played an important role in the development of Sajama volcano.

Composition
The volcano has erupted rocks ranging from andesite to rhyodacite, with the main stratovolcano formed by andesites that contain hornblende and pyroxene and phenocrysts of augite, biotite, iron oxide, olivine, orthopyroxene, pargasite, plagioclase, quartz and titanium oxide. Deposits of copper, gold, lead, silver and sulfur were reported as well. The volcanic rocks erupted by Sajama define a potassium-rich calc-alkaline suite and formed through various processes, including assimilation of country rock, fractional crystallization and magma mixing (particularly in the Sayara lavas).

Climate
The daily temperature range approaches  there.

Sajama is located between two climate regimes, a westerly one characterized by a dry climate and the Southeast Pacific High and an easterly one with a moister atmosphere. During the southern hemisphere summer, easterly winds carry moist air towards Sajama where solar insolation then triggers showers and thunderstorms; the moisture ultimately originates in the Atlantic Ocean. During winter, dry westerly winds prevail although cold air outbreaks from the westerlies belt sometimes trigger intense snowfall which is often underestimated by precipitation data. Overall, on the Altiplano precipitation diminishes from the northeast to the southwest.

Summer precipitation is typically reduced during El Nino years, but on Nevado Sajama there is little correlation.

Vegetation
While the vegetation of the surroundings of Sajama is considered to be a dry grassland known as puna, on the mountain itself there is some vertical gradation. Below  shrubs such as asteraceae, cactaceae, fabaceae and solanaceae dominate the vegetation. Between  the last three families become less important. Here especially during the wet season poaceae grasses become more important; finally above  frost-tolerant herbs such as Azorella and asteraceae, caryophyllaceae, malvaceae and poaceae make up most of the vegetation. In depressions or places where water occurs, peat bogs called bofedales develop. Taxa that occur here include apiaceae, cyperaceae, Azolla, Distichia and Plantago.

Up to  elevation Polylepis tarapacana forms woodlands that have both a sharp upper and a sharp lower limit on the mountain. The current woods are remnants; whether the decrease is caused by human impact or climate change is not clear. Protecting these woodlands was the impetus for the 1939 creation of the Sajama National Park.

Glaciers

Above , Sajama is extensively glaciated. It is among the southernmost mountains in the region with significant glaciers; farther south the atmosphere is too dry to permit the development of glaciers. Two ice cores were taken from the summit area in 1997, preceded by a religious ceremony, as the local Aymara people feared that the mountain deities would be angered by the drilling otherwise. Rock glaciers also occur above the zero degree isotherm above , such as on lateral peaks. Meltwater from the glaciers partially seeps underground and only reappears away from the volcano.

Sajama and neighbouring mountains featured much larger glaciers in the past. The history of glaciation on Sajama in general is poorly known, but it appears that the outermost glacial features originated during the late last glacial maximum and the intermediary features during the Middle Holocene which is usually considered to be a warm and dry period in the region.

Human interactions
A number of oral traditions record beliefs involving Sajama. In one myth, Sajama is the head of the Mururata mountain after the latter was decapitated by Illimani mountain, both in the Eastern Cordillera. Other mythologies assert that the Nevados de Payachata (Pomerape and Parinacota) are the children of Sajama and Anallaxchi. In another local belief, Tacora and Sajama were two mountains in competition for two women (the Nevados de Payachata). Depending on the specific myth either the two women drove Tacora off and removed the top of the mountain, or Sajama did and injured Tacora; Tacora subsequently fled, shedding blood and a piece of its heart.

During the second undisputed ascent on the mountain in 1946, one mountaineer disappeared and his body was never found. In August 2001, two teams of Sajama villagers and Bolivian mountain guides played a football match on top of Mount Sajama in an effort to show that altitude itself is not a limitation to physical strain. 

In 2015, a challenge to hold a political debate on the summit of Sajama was made by a candidate to an election. The 50-boliviano Bolivian banknote launched in October 2018 shows Sajama on its reverse.

See also
 Asu Asuni
 Jach'a Kunturiri
 K'isi K'isini
 Llisa
 Pomerape
 Sajama Lines
 Waña Quta
 List of volcanoes in Bolivia

References

Sources

Bibliography

External links
 Climbing Sajama and Illimani
 
 Detailed description of the volcano

Stratovolcanoes of Bolivia
Mountains of Bolivia
Subduction volcanoes
Volcanoes of Oruro Department
Extinct volcanoes
Glaciers of Bolivia
Six-thousanders of the Andes
Pleistocene stratovolcanoes